Chrysococcyx is a genus of cuckoo in the family Cuculidae.

The genus Chrysococcyx was erected by the German zoologist Friedrich Boie in 1826 with the African emerald cuckoo (Chrysococcyx cupreus) as the type species. The name Chrysococcyx  combines the Ancient Greek χρυσος khrusos meaning "gold" and κοκκυξ kokkux "cuckoo".

Some authorities split the principally Australo-Papuan taxa into the genus Chalcites.

The genus contains the following species:
Afro-Asian
 Diederik cuckoo (Chrysococcyx caprius)
 African emerald cuckoo (Chrysococcyx cupreus)
 Yellow-throated cuckoo (Chrysococcyx flavigularis)
 Klaas's cuckoo (Chrysococcyx klaas)
 Asian emerald cuckoo (Chrysococcyx maculatus)
 Violet cuckoo (Chrysococcyx xanthorhynchus)

Australo-Papuan
 Horsfield's bronze cuckoo (Chrysococcyx basalis)
 Shining bronze cuckoo (Chrysococcyx lucidus)
 White-eared bronze cuckoo (Chrysococcyx meyerii)
 Little bronze cuckoo (Chrysococcyx minutillus)
 Black-eared cuckoo (Chrysococcyx osculans)
 Rufous-throated bronze cuckoo (Chrysococcyx ruficollis)
 Long-billed cuckoo (Chrysococcyx megarhynchus)

References

 
Bird genera
Taxonomy articles created by Polbot
Taxa named by Friedrich Boie